Muslim Murdalovich Daliyev (born 16 June 1964) is a Russian football coach and a former player.

Personal life
His sons Deni Daliyev and Daud Daliyev are footballers.

External links
 

1964 births
Sportspeople from Grozny
Living people
Soviet footballers
FC Baltika Kaliningrad players
FC Mordovia Saransk players
Russian footballers
Russian football managers
Association football midfielders
FC Taganrog players